

Dan the Dyna-Mite

Damien Darhk
Damien Darhk is a fictional character appearing in American comic books published by DC Comics.

Damien Darhk is an elusive and dangerous criminal mastermind and enemy of the Teen Titans. He makes his first appearance in Titans #1 (March 1999). Claiming to be a major player in the American underworld and implying he has an army at his disposal, Darhk is shown to be well-established and well-connected despite being in his early 20s and has remained untouchable by the FBI and the CIA.

He appears to have some connection to the crime syndicate the H.I.V.E. and has access to unique high-tech equipment unknown to any organization. Darhk uses trickery and forgotten science to make his followers and the public believe he has mystical or magical powers, but is later proven to be a fraud. Darhk is also a Wi-Fi genius, able to stay in touch with anyone by the very latest forms of mass communication. During an altercation with the Titans, Darhk was shot to death by Vandal Savage. Thanks to Adeline Kane, he survived.

Damien Darhk in other media
 Damien Darhk appears in Arrow, portrayed by Neal McDonough. Ra's al Ghul's personal history mentions him as a friend-turned-rival in season three. Described as a renegade member of the League of Assassins who left after being denied leadership to form a "hive" of his own, he is behind many past events in the series and appears as season four's main antagonist. Damien uses a magical artifact called the Khushu Idol to employ telekinesis and can also drain the life energy of his foes if he makes physical contact with them. The only exception to this is Thea Queen who causes his life-force absorption ability to backfire due to being revived by the Lazarus Pit. Although a ruthless killer, when the Green Arrow saves his family from Anarky, Damien allows Oliver Queen to leave, despite having a chance to kill him, out of appreciation for the actions. Damien's artifact is eventually destroyed by Vixen and he is prosecuted and sent to Iron Heights Penitentiary. But, after recruiting the Dark Archer, Brick and Murmur, he eventually breaks out and murders Laurel Lance / Black Canary. After Anarky kills his wife and destroys the secret underground city in which Damien planned to survive the nuclear holocaust he wanted to cause, he becomes nihilistic and decides to destroy the world anyway. With the help from Mr. Terrific and the Calculator, Oliver's allies succeed in disabling all but one of the nuclear bombs (a city is destroyed by the successful nuke). Meanwhile, the Green Arrow leads the people of Star City in a rally against Damien and his army, with the outpouring of hope nullifying Damien's powers. The two engage in a physical fight with Oliver overpowering him. Defeated, Damien taunts the Green Arrow, stating Oliver spared Slade Wilson after killing Oliver's mother. Oliver reminds him that he killed tens of thousands of innocent people, including Laurel, and states not having a choice before stabbing him with an arrow, killing him. He returned in season five as a manifestation from a Dominator's mental simulation in the 100th episode.
 Neal McDonough also appears as Damien Darhk briefly in The Flash. In the episode "Legends of Today", the Flash rescues Team Arrow from Darhk's attack during a raid on an A.R.G.U.S. facility. McDonough reprises his role in the eighth season during the "Armageddon" crossover event. As the Reverse-Flash causes a Reverse-Flashpoint to change the timeline to alter Flash's life, Darhk is now alive and is working alongside this timeline's Reverse-Flash. Both of them were responsible for the deaths of Ray Palmer, Nate Heywood, Sara Lance, most of the Legends, and Cisco Ramon. Darhk was apprehended, but got off due to a technicality which sparked protests. After the actual Flash tries to trick him into helping him, he quickly realizes that he isn't the Reverse-Flash. Upon learning that his daughter is still alive in the other timeline where Nora is dead in this timeline, he helps him out. After Flash resets the timeline, Darhk has a heartfelt conversation with Joe and his daughter before he is erased and Nora returns to existence.
 Neal McDonough appears again as Damien Darhk in Legends of Tomorrow. In season one, he is a minor antagonist. He attends a weapons auction held by Vandal Savage in the 1970s. Damien returns in season two as a recurring character, one of the two secondary antagonists alongside Merlyn, and a member of the Legion of Doom. He also serves as an archenemy to Sara Lance, Laurel's sister and the Legends' leader. Although initially hesitant to work with Eobard Thawne / Reverse-Flash, he quickly joins forces upon learning of his future death and the failure of his plans from Sara. Together with Eobard, his future/former accomplice and the rest of the Legion of Doom, he works to find the fabled Spear of Destiny to change his fate. After they succeed, Damien makes himself mayor of Star City and regains his magical artifact. However, the Legends manage to travel back in time to stop the Legion's success. Eobard also travels back in time to warn the past Legion, so Damien sets out with the Legion to stop the Legends in a final battle. Using swords and a futuristic gun courtesy of Eobard, Damien eventually kills the future counterpart of Citizen Steel before engaging in hand-to-hand combat with Sara. Sara manages to overpower and knock him out. After the Legion is defeated, the Legends return each member of the Legion to their respective place in the timeline and wipe their memories of time travel, so Damien ends up dying in 2016 as before. In season three, Damien is the secondary antagonist. He is resurrected from his death by his time-displaced daughter Nora Darhk with his memories restored and resumes his feud with Sara, the Legends and their allies. He later encounters Gorilla Grodd upon saving him from the napalm bombing during the Vietnam War and claims to have time traveling technology that will let Grodd travel through time at will. It is revealed that his alliance with Mallus is intended to ensure Mallus' release from his prison dimension by causing temporal aberrations that will weaken it, but this effort is complicated when tension arises between Damien and his daughter over their differing approaches to their relationship. Damien, after being convinced by Steel and the Atom that his daughter will cease to exist if Mallus is set free, decides to help the Legends stop Mallus from taking Nora's body, but ends up taking Nora's place and is killed by Mallus in the season three finale. In season five, Astra Logue grants Damien a second chance at life. He was supposed to cause misery, but instead went to go see Nora. She had to hide the fact of her current status by stating that Constantine is her boyfriend and that Sara and Ava are now her henchmen. Everything unraveled when the ring that Ray bought was placed in a chocolate mousse. Nora's latest charge wishes them all into an episode of Mr. Parker's Cul-De-Sac (a parody of Mister Rogers' Neighborhood) where they all worked out their issues in the most unlikeliest of ways. Afterwards, Damien allows Nora to marry Ray. After talking to Sara what Astra wanted him to do, Damien briefly borrowed the Hellsword previously used by Genghis Khan and stabbed himself.

Darkseid

Dark Angel

Dava

Dawnstar

Deadman

Deadshot

Death

Deathstorm
Deathstorm is a fictional character appearing in American comic books published by DC Comics as the supervillain counterpart of Firestorm. The character was created by Geoff Johns and Peter Tomasi, and first appeared in Brightest Day #10 (November 2010).

Black Lantern version
The Black Lantern version first appeared in Blackest Night #2 (August 2009) as the Black Lantern Firestorm and officially in Brightest Day #10 (November 2010) as Deathstorm.

The character appears in the Blackest Night miniseries as Ronnie Raymond's reanimated corpse via a black power ring of the Black Lantern Corps. He confronts Barry Allen/The Flash and Hal Jordan/Green Lantern alongside Hawkman, Hawkgirl, the Elongated Man, Sue Dibny and J'onn J'onzz. Deathstorm then attacks and absorbs Jason Rusch into his own version of the Firestorm Matrix. Deathstorm kills Gehenna and absorbs Jason's anger, providing the Black Lanterns with even more emotional energies. He goes on to attack Barry and company at the Justice League satellite, but Jason briefly asserts control which allows the heroes to escape. Regaining control, Deathstorm proceeds to absorb Jason's willpower. Like other Black Lanterns, Deathstorm mimics Ronnie's personality of wisecracking and other stereotypical teenage behavior. Deathstorm is seemingly destroyed during the final battle against Nekron, in which Ronnie is restored to life alongside Jason.

In the Brightest Day miniseries, Deathstorm's actions continued tensions between Ronnie and Jason. The creature is seen as a monstrous construct of Gehenna, and transmuted a construction site without warning into bubble gum which revealed something lurked within the Firestorm Matrix. The creature reaches out of Firestorm, forcibly separating Ronnie and Jason while officially calling himself Deathstorm. Deathstorm intends to use the emotional instability between Ronnie and Jason that the Firestorm Matrix will trigger a Big Bang-level event to destroy all life in the universe, absorbing Martin Stein and Alvin Rusch into himself to torture Ronnie and Jason. Deathstorm beckons Firestorm to follow to Silver City, New Mexico which is the Central Power White Lantern Battery's resting place. Deathstorm tries to lift the battery, but is unable to until he infects the battery with black energy after which he is able to lift with ease. Deathstorm uses the Central Power White Lantern Battery to create an army of the Black Lantern spectrums of Professor Zoom/Reverse-Flash, Maxwell Lord, Hawk, Jade, Captain Boomerang, the Martian Manhunter, Aquaman, Hawkman, Hawkgirl, Deadman and Osiris. Deathstorm and the Black Lanterns move to an unknown location. Deathstorm has an internal argument with Martin and Alvin, messing with his two hostages. Deathstorm and the Black Lanterns are shown on Qward delivering the White Lantern Battery for the Anti-Monitor seeking to harvest the life energy to grow stronger. Firestorm takes the White Lantern Battery and attempts to fight the Anti-Monitor, but is defeated. Deathstorm brings Martin out of his own Firestorm Matrix to taunt. Deathstorm then attempts to kill Jason and Ronnie, but the Professor takes the attack. Ronnie and Jason truly work together, and the Entity then unleashes a burst of white energy that obliterates the Black Lanterns, returns Alvin home, and deposits Firestorm in the Star City forest.

Earth-3 version
An Earth-3 equivalent first appeared in Justice League (vol. 2) #23 (October 2013) as a doppelganger of Firestorm during the "Trinity War" event. This alternate Deathstorm is Earth-3's Professor Martin Stein fused with a corpse, and is a member of the Crime Syndicate. Deathstorm is later killed by Mazahs who then steals his powers.

Deathstorm in other media
 Two variations of Deathstorm appear in The Flash. 
 An Earth-2 incarnation appears in the second season, portrayed by Robbie Amell. This version is Firestorm's villainous doppelganger, one of Zoom's enforcers, and Killer Frost's significant other. Deathstorm nearly kills Barry Allen, but Zoom kills him for recklessness.
 An Earth-Prime equivalent, inspired by the Black Lantern incarnation, appears in the eighth season, portrayed by Milton Barnes, Alexa Barajas, and Rick Cosnett. This version is a cold fusion entity who obtained sentience as a black flame initially after Earth-1 Ronnie Raymond's sacrifice. Deathstorm attacks and kills indiscriminately throughout Central City by feeding on grief while using phantoms of deceased loved ones until it is defeated by Hell Frost.
 The Martin Stein incarnation of Deathstorm appears in Lego DC Super-Villains, voiced by Lex Lang.

Deathstroke

Decay

Deep Blue

Deep Blue is a superhero in the DC Universe. The character was created by Peter David and Jim Calafiore, and first appeared in Aquaman (vol. 3) #23 (August 1996).

Within the context of the stories, Debbie Perkins is the daughter of Tsunami and grew up believing Neptune Perkins to be her father, while Rhombus believed her to be his daughter. As Deep Blue, she is among the heroes who respond to Aquaman's call to unite the undersea kingdoms. Over time, she begins to insist on being called Indigo and learns that Atlan claims to be her true father.

Duela Dent

DeSaad

Despero

Detective Chimp

Dex-Starr

Dex-Starr is an abandoned stray blue domestic cat from Earth, adopted by a woman in Brooklyn who names him Dexter. During a break-in, Dex-Starr scratched a burglar before his owner was killed and he was evicted by the police. Homeless, he was grabbed by two street thugs and thrown off the Brooklyn Bridge, but the rage that he felt caught the attention of a red power ring and it came to him before he hit the water. As a member of the Red Lantern Corps, wearing his red power ring around his tail, he killed the two thugs and slept on their skulls, proclaiming himself to be a "good kitty" using thoughts expressed in simple sentences. He was described by Geoff Johns in an interview with Wizard as "the most sadistic and malicious" of the Red Lanterns. Originally intended as a joke by Shane Davis, he began being featured more prominently due to positive reception. Dex-Starr frequently travels with Atrocitus, with his vengeful quest centering on finding the burglar that murdered his owner. Dex-Starr gained the ability to create constructs after drinking the blood of Rankorr and, unbeknownst to his fellow Red Lanterns, he used his newfound ability to save Atrocitus from certain death after the former leader of the Red Lanterns saw his red power ring being taken by Guy Gardner.

Dex-Starr in other media 
 Dex-Starr appears in Justice League Action, with his vocal effects provided by Jason J. Lewis.
 Dex-Starr appears in DC Super Hero Girls, voiced by Kevin Michael Richardson as a Red Lantern while Fred Tatasciore provides his vocal effects. Introduced in the episode "#RageCat", this version is a stray Maine Coon without whiskers who was found by Jessica Cruz. Amidst her attempts to find his owner, Dex-Starr briefly gains a Red Lantern ring before Cruz adopts him. In the episode "#It'sComplicated", he regains his powers and joins Star Sapphire and Sinestro in attacking Cruz and Hal Jordan until Jordan apologizes to the trio.
 Dex-Starr appears in Lego DC Comics Super Heroes: Aquaman: Rage of Atlantis, voiced again by Dee Bradley Baker.
 Dex-Starr appears as a summonable character in Scribblenauts Unmasked: A DC Comics Adventure.
 Dex-Starr appears as an assist character for Atrocitus in Injustice 2.
 Dex-Starr appears as a playable character in Lego Batman 3: Beyond Gotham and Lego DC Super-Villains, with his vocal effects provided by Dee Bradley Baker.

Ding Dong Daddy

Doctor Alchemy

Doctor Chaos

In the Earth-1 universe, Professor Lewis Lang and his assistant Burt Belker discover a helmet in the Valley of Ur in Mesopotamia that is identical to the helmet on Earth-2 except for its blue color. This helmet contains a Lord of Chaos that possesses Burt and turns him into the sorcerer Doctor Chaos, whose costume is identical to Doctor Fate's except for a reversed color scheme. Superboy confronts Doctor Chaos and removes the helmet from Burt, jettisoning it into space.

A new version of Doctor Chaos later appeared briefly in the Justice League of America 2018 series within the main DC Comics Universe. This version is aligned with the Lords of Chaos outfitted in garb similar to Doctor Fate except for a reverse color scheme much like the Earth-1 version. Acting as a protector of the Lords of Chaos's base of operations, the Chaos Realm, he appears when the Justice League's mystical villain, Queen of Fables, attempts to escape her imprisonment. He is swiftly killed by the Queen of Fables and escapes the Chaos Realm. The identity of the person behind Doctor Chaos remains unknown.

Doctor Cyber

Doctor Destiny

Doctor Fate

Doctor Light

Arthur Light

Kimiyo Hoshi

Doctor Manhattan

Doctor Mid-Nite

Doctor Moon
Doctor Moon is a fictional character appearing in American comic books published by DC Comics.

Doctor Moon is a criminal neurosurgeon who sells his services to other villains that require his unethical skills of body modifications, psychological conditions, and torture. Doctor Moon was first seen in the Pre-Crisis as a member of the League of Assassins. Ra's al Ghul wanted him to reanimate a brain of a corpse so that he can interrogate only for that plan to be foiled by Batman.

Doctor Cyber later enlisted Doctor Moon as part of a plot to switch brains with Wonder Woman. This plan failed and Wonder Woman defeated both villains.

Doctor Moon was later hired by Guano Cravat to assist in his revenge on Richard Dragon and Lady Shiva. To assist in this plot, Doctor Moon performed surgical enhancements on a group of brutes. These brutes were defeated by Richard Dragon and Lady Shiva.

Ivan Angst of Mercenaries Inc. hired Doctor Moon to experiment on a human test subject and make it into the perfect fighting machine named Gork to defeat Batman. Angst and Gork perished in the conflict, but Doctor Moon got away.

Doctor Moon was later hired by Tobias Whale where his experiment confirmed that the woman known as Halo has lost her memory.

In the Post-Crisis, Doctor Moon was responsible for turning Air Wave II into Maser.

On behalf of Intergang, Doctor Moon prepared Cat Grant for a brainwashing program so that she would change her testimony against Morgan Edge. The plot was foiled by Batman, Superman, and Gangbuster.

Doctor Moon was later killed by Manhunter who stabbed him with a scalpel.

Doctor Moon in other media
Doctor Moon appears in the Justice League Unlimited episode "Question Authority", voiced by Jeffrey Combs who was uncredited for the role. He is shown to be a member of Project Cadmus and a torture expert that interrogated The Question, until almost killed by Huntress.

Doctor Moon appears in Young Justice, voiced by Vic Chao. Doctor Moon Dae-il is depicted as a physician who patches up villains.

Doctor No-Face

Doctor No-Face is a supervillain in the DC Universe.

The character, created by Dave Wood and Sheldon Moldoff, only appeared in Detective Comics #319 (September 1963).

Within the context of the stories, Bart Magan attempts to remove a facial scar using an experimental device. When the device erases all of his facial features instead, he takes the name "Doctor No-Face" and starts a short-lived crime spree in Gotham City.

Doctor No-Face in other media
Doctor No-Face appears in the Batman: The Brave and the Bold episode "A Bat Divided!".

Doctor Occult

Doctor Poison

Doctor Polaris

Doctor Psycho

Doctor Sivana

Doctor Trap
Doctor Lawrence Trapp, a.k.a. Doctor Trap (first appearance: Chase #3 (April 1998), is a supervillain with a mechanical jaw. He is an enemy to the Justice Experience, the Martian Manhunter and Cameron Chase.

Doctor Trap in other media
Doctor Trap appears in Harley Quinn, voiced by Alan Tudyk. When Gotham fell into ruin during the season one finale, this version took over a museum, stored various weapons he collected from other supervillains and used various booby traps to protect them. In the season two episode "Trapped", Harley Quinn, Poison Ivy, Kite Man, and Catwoman break into Trap's museum to retrieve Firefly's flamethrower. However, Catwoman abandons the group after they get caught in one of Trap's namesakes. After escaping, Harley breaks Trap's jaw with her baseball bat. Trap also makes a cameo appearance in the episode "Something Borrowed, Something Green", having had his jaw repaired before attending Ivy and Kite Man's wedding.

Doctor Tyme
Doctor Tyme (Percival Sutter) is a supervillain in the DC Universe and enemy of the Doom Patrol.

Doctor Tyme in other media
 Doctor Tyme appears in a flashback in the Batman: The Brave and the Bold episode "The Last Patrol!".
 Doctor Tyme appears in issue #24 of the Super Friends comic book series as a member of W.O.R.M.S., a group of mad scientists led by Lex Luthor.
 Doctor Tyme appears in Doom Patrol, portrayed by Brandon Perea and voiced by Dan Martin.

Dodger
Debuting in Green Arrow and Black Canary #7 (June 2008), Dodger is a thief who deals in high-end merchandise. Operating from London, England, Dodger will steal and/or sell anything from information to advanced technology.

At one point he came into possession of what appeared to be an alien spacecraft. Recognizing that the vehicle's stealth capabilities made it a lucrative commodity, he began leasing the vessel to various underworld figures, including the League of Assassins. When the vessel in question was linked to an assassination attempt against Connor Hawke, Green Arrow, and Black Canary began investigating its activity. The trail led them to London where they (along with Mia "Speedy" Dearden) engaged in combat with Dodger at a local pub. Although Dodger proved to be an able-bodied physical combatant, "Team Arrow" subdued him and he told them about the League of Assassins.

When pressed for more information, Dodger was unwilling to cooperate, so the Green Arrow and the Black Canary dropped him from the belly of a cargo plane suspended by a bungee cord until he agreed to give them better intelligence. He took them to his secret lair and triangulated the last location of the stealth ship he had leased.

The Green Arrow and the Black Canary then persuaded him to accompany them on the search, which brought them to a castle in Leichestershire, England. They evaded several traps and finally discovered a cryogenics tube containing the compressed form of former Justice Leaguer Plastic Man.

Dodger continued to work alongside "Team Arrow" and fought a team of metahumans who claimed to represent the League of Assassins. Dodger contributed very little to the battle; however, he did manage to distract one of them long enough for Batman to subdue him. Dodger continued adventuring with the group, battled foes and completed the adventure along with the team.

After settling their business with the League of Assassins, Dodger accompanied "Team Arrow" back to the United States, where he struck up a romantic relationship with Mia Dearden. Mia has now left the States and traveled to London to continue this relationship.

Dodger in other media
 Dodger appears in a self-titled episode of Arrow, portrayed by James Callis. This version is Winnick Norton, a British jewel thief who wields a stun stick and employs hostages with bomb collars to steal for him. He is defeated by Oliver Queen and John Diggle and arrested by the Starling City Police Department.
 The Arrow incarnation of Dodger appears in the non-canonical tie-in comic Arrow: Season 2.5. After escaping from prison, he moves to Bludhaven and joins a mercenary group called the Renegades. Under Clinton Hogue's orders, they kidnap Felicity Smoak, but are defeated by Queen, Roy Harper and Helena Bertinelli, who leave them for the police.

Doll Man

Dollmaker

Dominus

Dominus is a fictional character and a DC Comics supervillain who first appeared in Action Comics #747. He appears primarily as an opponent of Superman.

Originally, Dominus was an alien priest named Tuoni, who served as one of the five custodians of his world's faith. During this time, he fell in love with his peer, Ahti. However, he was driven mad by jealousy when Ahti ascended past him and assumed the mantle of Kismet, Illuminator of All Realities.

Studying infernal forbidden magic in an attempt to gain the power to challenge his former lover and rob her of the power of Kismet, Tuoni's assault was reflected by Kismet's divine energies and his body was incinerated. Despite Tuoni's deceit, the omnibenevolent Kismet showed him mercy and shunted his shattered, still-living body into the Phantom Zone.

Within the Phantom Zone, Tuoni encountered a holographic projection of Superman's long-dead Kryptonian ancestor, Kem-L, who was able to use his own ancient variety of arcane Kryptonian science to rebuild the former holy man as a psionic cosmic phantasm known as "Dominus".

In this new all-powerful form, Dominus escaped the Zone via Superman's Fortress of Solitude and attacked Earth. Attempting to find Kismet to steal her cosmic powers, he was opposed by Superman. Swearing vengeance, Dominus telepathically entered Superman's mind and preyed on one of the Man of Steel's greatest weaknesses; his fear of failing the people of Earth.

Using mind control, Dominus convinced Superman to take control of Earth and build the Superman robots to police the planet 24 hours a day, seven days a week forever. In another battle, Dominus used his reality-warping powers to become Superman, using the Superman robots to search for Kismet while Superman was disguised as one of his own robots and later as Dominus.

During his captivity in these other forms Superman improved on his use of Torquasm Vo, an ancient Kryptonian warrior discipline technique where the warrior can control what they think. Superman and Dominus then engaged in a mental-physical battle with Dominus using any stray thought of Superman to reshape reality. The battle ends with Superman banishing Dominus to the Phantom Zone.

Doomsday

Dabney Donovan
Dabney Donovan is a character in DC Comics.

Dabney Donovan is a genetic scientist who founded Project Cadmus with Reginald Augustine and Thomas Thompkins. Dabney Donovan was ultimately fired from the Project because he felt there should never be limits in understanding the potential of the genetic code. Donovan had largely been accredited for the non-human creations of the Project, referred to as "DNAliens" (human beings cloned then genetically altered to discover superhuman potential while also giving them a more "alien" appearance), various normal clones, and monsters based on Donovan's favorite horror films (who lived on a small artificial planet on Earth called Transilvane). One of the DNAliens named Dubbilex became a prominent staff member.

Lex Luthor's estranged wife Contessa Portenza worked Dabney Donovan shortly after Superman regained his normal powers when he expended his electromagnetic ones. To assist in the Contessa's plot, Dabney created his own Bizarro clone.

During the "Fall of Metropolis" storyline, Dabney Donovan was revealed to be the creator of the Underworlders and the true mastermind behind the clone virus. He later murders Paul Westfield and cuts off one of his ears as a trophy.

Dabney Donovan returned multiple times to plague Cadmus, such as capturing the adult Legion and subjecting them to various torments as wells. After the death of his clone, Dabney was underground when he found Moxie Mannheim badly injured. He even created youthful clone bodies for Moxie Mannheim and his henchmen Ginny "Torcher" McGee, Mike "Machine" Gun, Noose, and Rough House where they also received superpowers. With his original body used as a bomb upon it's death during a meeting with the other crime lords, Moxie had Noose kill Vincent Edge while Dabney Donovan makes use of any genetic material that he can salvage from the dead crime lords.

When Mickey Cannon re-established Project Cadmus, Dabney Donovan was brought back under armed guard and made an "imprisoned advisor". He briefly took control of the place during the "Evil Factory" storyline.

Dabney Donovan in other media
Dabney Donovan makes his live-action debut in Superman and Lois, portrayed by Robel Zere. This version is a physician, a scientist, and a former MIT student who assists Morgan Edge (later revealed to be the alias of Superman's half-brother Tal-Rho) in his experiments involving the Eradicator and X-Kryptonite. A flashback in the episode "Haywire" has him and Edge finding X-Kryptonite in Europe. In the episode "Loyal Subjekts", Donovan and Edge start empowering some Smallville inhabitants with X-Kryptonite and the Eradicator. In the episode "O' Brother, Where Art Thou?", Superman and the military led by Sam Lane find Donovan and the Eradicator in a building where Superman persuades him to cooperate with the Department of Defense.

Dabney Donovan appears in The Death of Superman and its sequel Reign of the Supermen, voiced by Trevor Devall. This version is a LexCorp employee who formerly worked for Project Cadmus and is specialized in bioengineering. He is tasked by Lex Luthor to create Superman clones for own army by the sequel. After he gives information of Superboy's cloning program to Lois Lane, he is punished and later killed by Luthor when he unleashes failed clones on him.

Dabney Donovan appears in DC Universe Online. He appears as a vendor in the Hall of Doom's Meta Wing.

Double Dare

Double Dare are a group of fictional characters appearing in American comic books published by DC Comics.

Double Dare are two female acrobats who operate in Blüdhaven where they rob people.

Double Dare in other media
Double Dare appear in DC Super Hero Girls where they are both voiced by Lauren Tom.

Double Down
Double Down is a fictional character appearing in American comic books published by DC Comics. He was introduced in The Flash: Iron Heights by Geoff Johns and Ethan Van Sciver.

A con man and compulsive gambler, Jeremy Tell gained his powers following a card game in which he lost. Incensed, he attacked and killed the man who had beaten him. The man had in his possession a cursed deck of cards, which cleaved to Tell's flesh and burned off much of his skin. The cards now act as the top layer of his skin, and can be wielded as weapons.

During his time in prison, the serial killer Murmur released the Frenzy virus at Iron Heights. Tell tried to escape in the ensuing mass breakout, but was stopped by Pied Piper. He was taken back to solitary confinement. A later attempt to break out was successful.

After escaping Iron Heights, he and Girder were both hired by Penguin to help him establish a crime ring in Keystone City, but was stopped by Flash and Nightwing.

In the aftermath of the ambush at the wedding of Green Arrow and Black Canary, Double Down hid in the backseat of a car and escaped with Piper and Trickster He held them at knife-point to help him in joining in their escape. At a roadside diner, Double Down wanted to join the two in their run from the law, afraid of the recent supervillain disappearances. The Suicide Squad had tracked them to the diner, and Double Down was taken in. The other two escaped.

Double Down in other media
Double Down appears in the Arrow episode "Restoration", portrayed by J.R. Bourne. This incarnation of Jeremy Tell was getting a tattoo in Central City when the particle accelerator exploded at Star Labs. Tell gained the ability to produce physical cards from his tattoos, using them as deadly weapons. He was hired by Mina Fayad of H.I.V.E. to kill the Green Arrow. In a confrontation with Spartan and the Green Arrow, Green Arrow took a card for Spartan and defeated Tell. Tell was locked up in Iron Heights in the metahuman wing.

Double Down makes a cameo in The Suicide Squad as an inmate alongside Calendar Man mocking Polka Dot Man. He was portrayed by Jared Leland Gore.

Draaga
Draaga is a fictional alien character in the DC Comics universe. He first appeared in The Adventures of Superman #454 and was created by Jerry Ordway, Roger Stern, and George Pérez.

In the "Superman in Exile" storyline, Superman has exiled himself from Earth due to psychological problems he was suffering from at the time. He is forced by the space villain Mongul to participate in his gladiatorial games. Draaga is the champion of the games, but Superman defeats him, then refuses to kill him. This baffles Draaga, whose code of honor demands a rematch against Superman, though he later comes to respect the hero. After Mongul is deposed by Superman, the aliens who control the artificial planet Warworld choose Draaga to be their new puppet ruler.

Draaga returns in the "Panic in the Sky" storyline where he is employed by Maxima to destroy Superman. The Superman he encounters here is actually the android Supergirl Matrix wearing Superman's form, who loses to Draaga on an asteroid. The second time Draaga loses on Warworld is in a contest held by Brainiac. Later Draaga joins Superman in the fight against Brainiac to regain his honor. He is killed while jumping into an organic anti-matter doomsday device created by Brainiac and is buried beside The Cleric, on the asteroid on which he first encountered Supergirl. The shapeshifting Matrix honours Draaga for the rest of the battle against Brainiac by adopting his form.

Draaga in other media
 Draaga appears in the Justice League episode "War World", voiced by William Smith.
 Draaga appears in the Supergirl episode "Survivors", portrayed by John DeSantis. He appears as a combatant in Roulette's underground fight club in National City. He is seen fighting Supergirl who after losing to him in the first battle came back to defeat him upon learning from Mon-El (who mentioned that he crossed paths with his race on several occasions) that he has a weak spot in his leg.
 Draaga appears in issue #20 of the Young Justice comic based on the show. Superman mentions he came to Metropolis to challenge him to a fight, but was defeated by him and Superboy. He is later found in stasis by Superman and Captain Atom aboard a ship controlled by Kylstar, an operative for The Collector of Worlds.

Dragon King
Dragon King is a fictional character from DC Comics. He was created by Roy Thomas and Rich Buckler, and first appeared in All-Star Squadron #4, in December 1981.

The man known as "Dragon King" was a high-ranking official in the Japanese government during World War II, as well as a brilliant scientist. He was the researcher responsible for the creation of the nerve gas K887. He obtained the mythical Holy Grail for Japan, and was able to combine it with Adolf Hitler's Spear of Destiny which the German dictator had loaned to Japanese General Hideki Tōjō. With the two items, the Dragon King and Hitler were able to create a field of arcane magic that shielded imperial Japan and Fortress Europa from attack by the allies' super heroes or "Mystery Men". The field ensured that any hero with magic-based powers, or a vulnerability to magic (like Superman), would instantly be converted to the Axis cause, keeping some of the allies' most powerful heroes out of the theatre of war. Some heroes were temporarily able to circumvent this for humanitarian missions, despite the Dragon King's best efforts. After Japan's surrender on August 15, 1945, the Dragon King went into hiding and experimented with combining his own genetic material with that of a lizard. He eventually succeeded in making himself a hybrid of human and reptile.

In more recent history, the Dragon King resurfaced in the fictional town of Blue Valley, Nebraska, with a daughter named Cindy Burman, now a villainess called "Shiv". While making use of a robot that operated as Principal Sherman at Blue Valley High School, Dragon King is served by Paintball, Skeeter, and Stunt. He clashed against the second Star-Spangled Kid, Courtney Whitmore, her sidekick S.T.R.I.P.E., and the Shining Knight, while the latter was on a quest to reclaim the Holy Grail. It is strongly implied during this confrontation that the Dragon King had in the past murdered the All-Star Squadron member Firebrand. During this fight, the Dragon King himself was apparently killed, although his body was never found.

He later resurfaced with the Spear of Destiny in his possession and attempted to raise an army of super-powered soldiers, but was defeated by the Justice Society of America.

In the pages of "The New Golden Age", Dragon King and Shiv are shown in a flashback fighting Stargirl and S.T.R.I.P.E.

Dragon King in other media
 Dragon King makes a cameo appearance in a flashback in the Young Justice episode "Humanity". He attempted to assassinate the Flash at the 1939 World's Fair, but Firebrand sacrifices herself to save the latter.
 Dragon King appears in Stargirl, portrayed by Nelson Lee. This version is a member of the Injustice Society of America (ISA) and a controversial scientist named Dr. Shiro Ito, who was originally an Imperial Japanese war criminal from World War II who was supposedly executed for his work with biological weapons. Having survived to the present day and acquired reptilian scales however, he hides his identity with an elaborate costume and experiments on himself and his patients. Throughout season one, he assists the ISA in their plot to enact "Project: New America" while monitoring Brainwave's son Henry King Jr. for burgeoning powers by forcing his daughter Cindy Burman to date the latter. By the season finale, Ito is fatally wounded by Burman. As of season three, he had transplanted his brain into the body of Ultra-Humanite, who in turn transplanted his into that of Starman's as part of Icicle's plot, with Ito set to be the scapegoat for "Starman" and Cameron to defeat to prove their worth as heroes. While fighting the heroes however, Ito is turned into a plush toy by Jakeem Williams and Thunderbolt.

Richard Dragon

Carl Draper
Carl Draper is a fictional character in DC Comics, an enemy of Superman. He has gone by the names the Master Jailer, Kator, Deathtrap, the Locksmith and Castellan. Draper made his first appearance in Superman #331 (January 1979), written by Martin Pasko and drawn by Curt Swan and Frank Chiaramonte.

In the Pre-Crisis comics, Carl "Moosie" Draper grew up in Smallville (see Kator below). Draper was an overweight clumsy teenager whom most of the other kids never noticed or made fun of and was in love with Lana Lang, who had eyes only for Superboy, much to Draper's resentment. As an adult, Draper underwent a self-imposed self-improvement regimen, including exercise and cosmetic surgery, to overcome his physical shortcomings. He became an expert locksmith and architect, designing an inescapable prison for supervillains called "Mount Olympus". Impressed by the achievement, Superman augmented the prison's security by placing it on an antigravity platform. Initially dubbed "Draper's Island" by Superman, it was informally renamed "Superman Island" by the adult Lana—with whom Draper remained smitten, just as she remained lovestruck by Superman. It was the latter name, plus the novelty of the floating platform, that caught public attention, diverting recognition from Draper himself. This proved the final straw for Draper, who snapped and became the costumed supervillain the Master Jailer. He attacked Superman and kidnapped Lana under that name. Superman defeated him and he was sent to his own prison.

In The New Adventures of Superboy #17 (May 1981), at the prodding of Carl, Superboy creates a robot named Kator as a sparring adversary (and gives the "safety cutoff switch" to Jonathan Kent). Kator, however, developed an artificial intelligence and almost killed the Boy of Steel before being destroyed (in The New Adventures of Superboy #18). The robot apparently gave Draper its identity and powers before being destroyed. Draper (as the new Kator) then engages Superboy in combat, but Jonathan Kent presses the safety switch on the "cutoff" device, which removes "Kator's" superpowers from Draper, and Superboy removes the memory of Draper ever being Kator.

In the Post-Crisis comics, Carl Draper first appeared in The Adventures of Superman #517 (November 1994). This was during the "Dead Again" storyline, when Superman was suspected of being an impostor after his body was found still in his tomb (from The Death of Superman storyline). Draper was hired by S.T.A.R. Labs to design a holding cell for Conduit, when his daughter, Carla, asked him if he could build a prison that could hold even Superman. Draper initially designed a trap that only the real Superman could escape from, explaining this to Superman by way of a hologram of a costumed figure named Deathtrap. When Superman escaped the trap, Draper became obsessed with proving that he could capture the real thing. Note: this version of Draper was dressed in casual wear, only getting an updated costume with chain-based attacks later.

Draper made several other attempts to capture Superman, often programming the Deathtrap hologram in advance so he could publicly be elsewhere. On one occasion, in Superman: The Man of Steel #43 (April 1995), he programmed Deathtrap to appear during a Draper Security press conference and display how Draper's devices were being "subverted", thus both removing suspicion from him and acting as an advertisement for the company.

In Action Comics #739, Superman (in his blue energy form) was captured in an "energy hobble" by Deathtrap, now calling himself the Locksmith. At the end of the story, it was revealed to the reader that his daughter, Carla Draper, was running the hologram this time and that her father was unaware of this. The now-costumed Master Jailer was one of the villains along with Neutron controlled by Manchester Black in the 2002 storyline "Ending Battle"; however, it was not clear that it was, in fact, Draper.

Carl Draper appears in Checkmate #17 (October 2007). At some point, Checkmate discovered his multiple identities and used this to force him into becoming a security consultant, protecting Checkmate itself from attack. In the issue, he prevents numerous assaults on Checkmate headquarters and is promoted to head of security with the title Castellan. Although he has not told his superiors, he strongly suspects that Carla is involved in the attacks. The issue also contains an Easter egg—computer displays show an actual website (now defunct) that could be accessed with the username "CARL DRAPER" and the password "wilhelmina". The site was a journal and database written from Draper's perspective. In his journal, he claimed to have been only Deathtrap and that he was unconnected with the Post-Crisis Master Jailer.

A DC Rebirth version of the Master Jailer appears in the Aquaman/Suicide Squad crossover "Sinking Atlantis" as a member of the Squad. Aspects of his Pre- and Post-Crisis history are present, with Carl growing up in Smallville and having a daughter.

Carl Draper in other media
The Master Jailer appears in Supergirl, portrayed by Jeff Branson. In this version, he is an alien from the planet Trombus who was a third-generation prison guard at Fort Rozz until the prison ship landed on Earth and many of the inmates escaped. He turned vigilante, hunting down and lynching several escapees until he was thwarted by Kara; in overview his methods were overzealous, as he even murdered aliens that were not violent and wanted peaceful lives. On Earth, he posed as Detective Draper of the National City Police Department.

Carla Draper
Carla Draper is the daughter of Carl Draper who made an appearance in Superboy (vol. 4) #26 (May 1996) under the name Snare. She responded to a request from the Hawaiian Special Crimes Unit to Draper Security for assistance in capturing the supervillain Knockout, who was on the run with a misguided Superboy in tow. Snare, aware of her father's obsession, tried to prove that she could do something that he could not by capturing Superboy. This led to a fight with the SCU, during which Superboy and Knockout escaped.

Penny Dreadful
Penny Dreadful is a fictional character appearing in American comic books published by DC Comics.

She is one of the children that Doctor Love experimented on while she was in her mother's womb. This experiment enabled her to develop energy-absorbing abilities. Taking the name Penny Dreadful, she became part of Helix where they fought Infinity, Inc. on occasion.

In 2011, "The New 52" rebooted the DC universe. Dubbilex appeared briefly during a scene where Kevin Kho OMAC attack Project Cadmus.

Dubbilex in other media
Dubbilex first appears in Young Justice episode "Independence Day" Pt. 1 voiced by Phil LaMarr. He is seen as a Genomorph, a type of being that are genetically-created as living weapons, and a member of Project Cadmus in one of its buildings alongside Dr. Mark Desmond, Guardian, and Dr. Amanda Spence. He assists his kind in a rebellion against Mark Desmond's leadership and how they are used as weapons. After Dr. Desmond as Blockbuster is defeated by Robin, Kid Flash, Aqualad, and Superboy and taken away by the Justice League, Dubbilex remains with Guardian and Dr. Amanda Spence at the Cadmus building. In the episode "Agendas," Dubbilex expresses disappointment that despite no longer being weapons, the Genomorphs are not allowed to leave the labs. He is revealed to have been secretly "liberating" some Genomorphs from Cadmus and building an underground city for them called Genomorph City with the long-term plan of gaining equality with humans on the surface. He returns in Young Justice: Outsiders in where it's been revealed that he and the Genomorphs have long since moved to a new city called Geranium City which was built by them and the Justice League. Dubbilex disguises himself and the others as humans through his psychic abilities where Dubbilex uses the alias of "Mayor Donovan".

Cal Durham

Cal Durham is a former henchman of Black Manta and a public figure in the DC Universe.

The character, created by David Michelinie and Jim Aparo, first appeared in Aquaman #57 (August–September 1977).

Within the context of the stories, Cal Durham is a mercenary hired by Black Manta under the pretense of establishing an African American-dominated underwater society. To this end, Durham undergoes surgical procedures to emulate Atlantean physiology. Discovering that Manta is more focused on destroying Aquaman than fulfilling his social promise, he rebels. This results in Manta attempting to kill him and Duhram re-evaluating his goals. Much later, he appears as the mayor of Sub Diego.

Cal Durham in other media
In the comic book tie-in of the TV series Young Justice, Calvin Durham appears as Kaldur'ahm's foster father. Formerly a henchman of the supervillain Black Manta, Calvin's physiology was genetically modified to match that of an Atlantean's to infiltrate Atlantis, but he defected to the Atlanteans and subsequently settled down with Aqualad's mother, Sha'lain'a of Shayeris. Calvin appears in the third season episode "Quiet Conversations", voiced by Phil LaMarr. He is present when Kaldur'ahm brings the Dolphin to Atlantis.

References
  Text was copied from Jeremy Tell (New Earth) at DC Database, which is released under a Creative Commons Attribution-Share Alike 3.0 (Unported) (CC-BY-SA 3.0) license.
  Text was copied from Jeremy Tell (Arrowverse) at DC Database, which is released under a Creative Commons Attribution-Share Alike 3.0 (Unported) (CC-BY-SA 3.0) license.

 DC Comics characters: D, List of